The Farmer's Boys were a British band from Norwich, England. They formed in the early 1980s and were briefly called 'Bang Goes My Stereo' before changing their name to 'The Farmer's Boys'.

History 
Initially a three piece act, the band employed a drum machine which gave them a somewhat distinctive sound, which combined elements of country and Western, disco and punk. The band's faux 'rural bumpkin' imagery and self-deprecating humour was an important part of their appeal, but led to some scathing reviews in the metropolitan music press. The band played many gigs with The Higsons and for a while was identified as one of the hubs of the 1980s Norwich scene, an eclectic collection of post-punk acts that fused indie and dance to varied degrees.

Early singles were released on local Norwich labels, with the band's first single, "I Think I Need Help", released in April 1982. This attracted airplay from John Peel who became a champion of the band and invited them for several sessions, with David Jensen doing likewise (they recorded three sessions for the latter in 1982–83). In January 1983, "More Than a Dream" was  their first single for EMI, a reissue of an independent single that gained some national airplay. Their next single 'Muck It Out' was a near-hit, with the Pete Waterman produced album Get Out and Walk well-received by older and newer fans alike despite its somewhat clean pop production.

In 1984, a cover of 'In the Country' – previously recorded by Cliff Richard – stalled just outside the Top 40 despite considerable national airplay and promotional TV appearances. This marked the nearest the band came to chart success. The subsequent album With These Hands lacked some of the energy of the debut, with the addition of a drummer both on record and live gigs moving the band further away from its early 'indie' sounds. Two more singles were released before the band split in 1985, citing the enigmatical reason of "electrical differences".

Post-split, Baz and Mark went on to form The Avons in 1985. Mark later joined The Nivens. Stan formed Dr Fondle. Frog joined The Higsons and played keyboards in a Julian Cope tour in the late 1980s and original guitarist Andy left early on to join Serious Drinking. In the 2000s, Bar, Mark and Stan played as the McGuilty Brothers.

Discography

Albums 
1983: Get Out and Walk (EMI, 1077993) – UK No. 49 (produced by Frog and Pete Hammond, except "For You" and "Matter of Fact", accompanied by a special edition 12-inch single featuring 12" versions of "For You", "Probably One of the Best Investments I Ever Made", "Soft Drink" and "Muck It Out")
1985: With These Hands

Compilation albums 
2003: Once Upon a Time in the East (The Early Years 1981–1982)

Singles

BBC Radio 1 'In Concert' 
A concert was recorded and broadcast from the Lyceum Theatre in London on 7 September 1983. The Farmer's Boys played the second half-hour, whilst another Norwich band the Higsons played the first half.
Tracks played:
"Whatever Is He Like?"
"Matter of Fact"
"Who Needs It?" (with Terry Edwards from The Higsons on saxophone)
"More Than a Dream" (with Terry Edwards on saxophone)
"I Woke Up This Morning"
"Soft Drink"
"The Way You Made Me Cry"
"For You"

References

External links 
 The Farmer's Boys Official/Unofficial site
 The Great Outdoors (Wayback Machine archive)

English new wave musical groups
English pop music groups
Musical groups established in 1981
Musical groups disestablished in 1985
Musical groups from Norfolk